The men's 200 metre individual medley event in swimming at the 2013 World Aquatics Championships took place on 31 July and 1 August at the Palau Sant Jordi in Barcelona, Spain.

Records
Prior to this competition, the existing world and championship records were:

Results

Heats
The heats were held at 10:51.

Semifinals
The semifinals were held at 19:16.

Semifinal 1

Semifinal 2

Final
The final was held at 18:13.

References

External links
Barcelona 2013 Swimming Coverage

Individual medley 200 metre, men's
World Aquatics Championships